Endodeoxyribonuclease are both endonucleases and deoxyribonucleases. They catalyze cleavage of the phosphodiester bonds in DNA. They are classified with EC numbers 3.1.21 through 3.1.25.

Examples include: 
 DNA restriction enzymes
 micrococcal nuclease

See also
 Ribonuclease
 UvrABC endonuclease

External links
 

EC 3.1
Deoxyribonucleases